Seth Andrew is an American entrepreneur who helped found Democracy Prep Public Schools, a national network of charter schools based in Harlem, and Democracy Builders, a social sector incubator that launched Washington Leadership Academy, the Arena Summit, and Degrees of Freedom. He was an advisor to former president Obama. In April 2021, Andrew was arrested for allegedly embezzling over $200,000 from Democracy Prep. He pled guilty to one charge of wire fraud in January 2022, and in July 2022 was sentenced to 366 days in prison.

Education 
Andrew attended the Bronx High School of Science, earned his A.B. from Brown University, and his Ed.M from the Harvard Graduate School of Education.

Career

Democracy Prep 
In 2005, Andrew founded Democracy Prep Public Schools in Harlem, New York. The network has grown to serve more than 6,500 students in New York, New Jersey, Louisiana, Nevada, and Texas. Democracy Prep has been the subject of significant academic research due to its emphasis on civic engagement and unique financial model that relies exclusively on public dollars.

Obama administration 
From 2014 to 2016, Andrew served as senior advisor and superintendent-in-residence at the U.S. Department of Education and was a senior advisor in the Office of Educational Technology under the Presidency of Barack Obama.

Bridge International Academies 
From 2017 to 2018, Andrew was Global Director of Policy & Partnerships at Bridge International Academies

Degrees of Freedom 
In 2020, under Andrew’s leadership, Democracy Builders and Marlboro College announced that Democracy Builders would acquire the Marlboro College campus in order to build a low-residency, low-cost college program for low-income students. The Degrees of Freedom program would last four years, from eleventh grade to the second year of college, and would result in an associate degree. The program is slated to be largely online, with students only being on campus two weeks out of each trimester.

In February 2021, Andrew announced that Democracy Builders had sold the campus to "Type 1 Civilization Academy" via a quitclaim deed. On March 9, 2021, During an invitation-only community meeting on Zoom, Andrew announced that the Type 1 deal had been cancelled. He called the agreement "an engagement" rather than "a marriage". Andrew filed another quit claim deed which transferred the property back to Democracy Builders. The principal of Type 1, Adrian Stein, said that Type 1 was legitimately in control of the campus and that the issue will likely end up in court unless they can find "some other kind of equitable settlement."

Degrees of Freedom is currently partnered with Doral College, a Florida-based educational institution.

Racism allegations 
In June 2020, Andrew was the subject of allegations of racism by "Black N Brown at DP", an anonymous group of Democracy Prep students, alumni, and present/former staff of color. The social media account claims that both Andrew himself and the schools he headed were built on an education system of systemic racism and manipulative behavior towards people of color. Andrew responded to the accusations in a June 24 post on Medium, which he later deleted. In the essay, Andrew apologized for his past mistakes and made promises regarding his future conduct.

The Marlboro Selectboard called on the Marlboro College Board of Trustees to investigate allegations of racism at Democracy Prep Charter Schools. The Marlboro Alumni Council condemned Andrew, and called for the sale of the college to be cancelled. Despite the accusations, the Marlboro College Board of Trustees announced they would proceed with the sale following their investigation into the allegations.

In July 2020, Andrew and members of Degrees of Freedom claimed that the "Black N Brown at DP" collective were creating false narratives and stories in order to deter the purchase of Marlboro College.

During a July 20, Town of Marlboro Select Board public meeting regarding the sale of Marlboro College to Andrew and Democracy Builders, the identity of a member of "Black N Brown at DP" who testified anonymously was revealed by two Democracy Prep supporters without her consent.

Arrest 
In April 2021, Andrew was arrested and charged with wire fraud, money laundering, and making false statements to a financial institution. Andrew was alleged to have embezzled $218,005 from bank accounts controlled by Democracy Prep Public Schools. Initially prosecutors alleged that Andrew embezzled this money in order to receive a lower mortgage rate for a multimillion dollar Manhattan apartment which he and his wife bought in August 2019. This claim was later withdrawn by the prosecution. Instead, prosecutors claimed that Andrew was frustrated that the school network refused to rehire him for $25,000 per month. 

Andrew was released on $500,000 bond. He was ordered to remain in Vermont, where he lived at the time. In January, 2022, Andrew pleaded guilty to moving more than $200,000 from bank accounts controlled by Democracy Prep to other non-profit entities he founded. On July 28, 2022, Andrew was sentenced to 366 days in prison by United States District Judge John P. Cronan in connection with his execution of a scheme to defraud Democracy Prep Public Schools (“DPPS”), a charter school network that he founded, of more than $218,000. The funds were eventually used to purchase the campus of the former Marlboro College, for Democracy Builders.

Personal life 
Andrew is married to CBS News anchor Lana Zak. The couple have three children.

References

Year of birth missing (living people)
Living people
Brown University alumni
Harvard Graduate School of Education alumni
The Bronx High School of Science alumni